Boris Timofeyevich Shtokolov (March 19, 1930 – January 6, 2005), was a famous Soviet and Russian singer, one of the greatest basses of the 20th century.

Boris Shtokolov was born in the settlement of Kuzedeyevo in Gorno-Shorsky District of Kuznetsk Okrug in Siberian Krai (now in Novokuznetsky District of Kemerovo Oblast). In 1949, he entered the Ural State Conservatory in Sverdlovsk (now Yekaterinburg), but wanted to become a military pilot. Georgy Zhukov, having heard his singing, said: There are many guys like you in aviation, but in opera singing you are unique. In 1950 and 1951, he was singing at the Sverdlovsk Philharmonic Society before he became a soloist at the Sverdlovsk Opera and Ballet Theater. In 1959, he was invited to the Mariinsky Theater in Leningrad (now St. Petersburg) where he gained world fame as a leading soloist from 1959 to 1989. At the Mariinsky Theater he sang a great number of roles, such as Ruslan, Don Basilio, Boris Godunov, Ivan Susanin, the title role in Anton Rubinstein's The Demon, Prince Gremin, Mefistofele, and many others.

He died on 6 January 2005 in St. Petersburg, and was buried at the Literatorskie Mostki of the Volkovo Cemetery.

Boris Shtokolov was also a prominent theorist of opera singing and breathing techniques. In 1995, he published a book Burn, Burn, My Star: How to Sing.

Honors
People's Artist of the USSR (1966)
USSR State Prize (1981)
Order of Lenin (1980)
Order of the October Revolution (1983)
Order of the Red Banner of Labor (twice)
Order of the Patriotic War (2nd class)
Honorary Member of the Slavic Academy
 Honorary Citizen of the Kemerovo Oblast (2002)

References

External links
Short biography 
Extracts from Shtokolov's memoirs and works about him
Article on Shtokolov in Neva News
Boris Shtokolov on YouTube

1930 births
2005 deaths
Soviet male opera singers
Honored Artists of the RSFSR
Operatic basses
People's Artists of the RSFSR
People's Artists of the USSR
People from Kemerovo Oblast
Recipients of the USSR State Prize
Recipients of the Order of Lenin
Russian basses